Anita Akua Kyerewaa Kuma (born 1980s) is a Ghanaian media personality, radio journalist. She is the host for Lunchtime Rhythms on Kumasi's most listened to English radio station, Luv FM. She was listed as number three of 10 on-air personalities in Ghana for 2018 which was put together by the Business Insider, operators of Pulse Ghana.

Education 
Kuma was born in Kumasi in the early 1980s to D.O.K. Kuma who was a geologist and his wife Victoria. She attended Wesley Girls Senior High School and graduated from the Kwame Nkrumah University of Science and Technology with a bachelor's degree in Building Technology.

Career 
Kuma has about 13 years experience working in radio. She is currently the host for  Lunchtime Rhythms on Kumasi's most listened to Ashanti radio station, Luv FM.

Awards 
Here are some awards she has won and been nominated for:

 
|-
|| 2016  ||| Anita Kuma || Radio and Television Personality Awards (Radio Female Presenter of the Year ) ||  
|-
|}

References

Living people
Ghanaian women journalists
Ghanaian journalists
Kwame Nkrumah University of Science and Technology alumni
Year of birth missing (living people)